XXIV Brigade, Royal Field Artillery was a brigade of the Royal Field Artillery which served in the First World War.

It was originally formed with 110th, 111th and 112th Batteries, and attached to 6th Infantry Division. In August 1914 it mobilised and in September was sent to the Continent with the British Expeditionary Force, where it saw service with 6th Division throughout the war. 43rd (Howitzer) Battery joined the brigade in May 1916.

External links
Royal Field Artillery Brigades
6th Division Order of Battle

Notes

References

Royal Field Artillery brigades
Artillery units and formations of World War I